St. George's Episcopal Church is an historic church located at 44965 Blake Creek Road, in Valley Lee, St. Mary's County, Maryland, United States.  It was built in 1799 on the same site as three other, earlier churches.  It is a one-story, five bay, rectangular, gable-front, Flemish bond brick structure. The interior has been restored to its 1884 appearance. The church is surrounded by a graveyard, enclosed by a low brick wall.  It is generally believed that St. George's is the site of the oldest Anglican church in Maryland whose parish is still in existence. William and Mary Parish, as it was originally known, was one of the original 30 Anglican parishes in the Province of Maryland.

The church was listed on the National Register of Historic Places in 1973.

References

External links

, including undated photo, at Maryland Historical Trust

Churches on the National Register of Historic Places in Maryland
Churches in St. Mary's County, Maryland
Episcopal church buildings in Maryland
Churches completed in 1799
18th-century Episcopal church buildings
Historic American Buildings Survey in Maryland
National Register of Historic Places in St. Mary's County, Maryland